Waltrip is a surname. Notable people with the surname include:

Brian Waltrip, soccer player
Buffy Waltrip, wife of Michael Waltrip
Darrell Waltrip, NASCAR race car driver and older brother of Michael
Jason Waltrip, comic book creator and member of the Waltrip brothers
John Waltrip, comic book creator and member of the Waltrip brothers
Michael Waltrip, NASCAR race car driver and younger brother of Darrell
Mildred Waltrip (1911–2004), American artist and illustrator

See also
Waltrip High School
Darrell Waltrip Motorsports
Michael Waltrip Racing
Waltrip brothers